

Canadian Football News in 1921
Western Canada Rugby Football Union joined the CRU and challenged for the Grey Cup. The Edmonton Eskimos became the first Western team to play in a Grey Cup game, but lost to the Toronto Argonauts 23–0.

Rule changes included reducing players from 14 to 12 per side; putting ball into play by snapping it back; limit of 18 players with substitutes permitted freely.

Regular season

Final regular season standings
Note: GP = Games Played, W = Wins, L = Losses, T = Ties, PF = Points For, PA = Points Against, Pts = Points
*Bold text means that they have clinched the playoffs

* Final game of the season was cancelled - not necessary

 League Champions 

Grey Cup playoffsNote: All dates in 1921 SRFU Playoff Regina won the first game (score 10 to 8) played on October 29. After a successful protest, the game was replayed on November 4.Saskatoon advances to the WCRFU semifinal Eastern semifinal Toronto Argonauts advance to the Eastern Final. Eastern final Toronto Argonauts advance to the Grey Cup. Western semifinal 

 Western final 

Edmonton advances to the Grey Cup

Playoff bracket

 Grey Cup Championship 

1921 Toronto Globe Eastern All-StarsNOTE: During this time most players played both ways, so the All-Star selections do not distinguish between some offensive and defensive positions.''
FW - Warren Synder, University of Toronto
HB - Harry Batstone, Toronto Argonauts
HB - Joe Breen, Toronto Parkdale
HB - Lionel Conacher, Toronto Argonauts
QB - Johnny Evans, Queen's University
QB - Hugh Cochrane, Toronto Argonauts
C  - Lionel Shoebottom, Toronto Parkdale
C  - Jimmy Douglas, Toronto Argonauts
G  - R. McCombe, McGill University
G  - Harold Pugh, Toronto Argonauts
G  - ???, Hamilton Tigers
T  - Doug Ambridge, McGill University
T  - John McKelvey, Queen's University
T  - Alex Romeril, Toronto Argonauts
E  - Ernie Rolph, University of Toronto
E  - Bud Thomas, Ottawa Rough Riders

References

 
Canadian Football League seasons